Ruyonga is a Ugandan musical artist of the hip hop and spoken word genres. He was one of the pioneering hip hop acts in Uganda, with his first group winning a nationwide music competition in 2000. He was picked by Rawkus Records as one of the top 50 artists on the internet, and Rawkus helped release his second solo album, AFRiCAN, in 2007. He is married and has a daughter. He was on DSTV's list in 2013 of African MC’s: In a League of their own. He has collaborated with his fellow Ugandan rappers like The mith, Bigtril, etc. He's also credited for delivering the finest verses in Ugandan cyphers notably Vuqa cypher.

Music
Ruyonga is a gospel rapper who has been based in the United States since 2002. He has worked with artists like JGivens, Magg 44, Enygma, Benezeri, Big Tril, Maurice Kirya and Don MC. The US-based emcee and graphic artist was previously known as Krukid, member of the hip-hop trio A.R.M. (African Rebel Movement / Artists Representing the Motherland) that also included M.anifest (Ghana) and Budo. He was included in Rawkus 50, the 2007 list compiled by Rawkus Records of the 50 next important hip hop artists. He recorded the soundtrack for Nana Kagga's 2012 film, The Life. In 2022, he teamed up with rising Stars 1 Der Jr and Zex Bilangilangi, and did a hip-hop banger Parte Yaani. A song that is doing heavily in both Uganda, Kenya and Rwanda.

Discography
AFRiCAN, 2007
S.O.S- Songs Of Struggle
Glory Fire 2017
Voice of my Father 2018

References

External links 
"Krukid Ruyonga sits down for an interview with GuerrillaCross"
"RUYONGA TAKES PANAMERA"

21st-century Ugandan male singers
Living people
Kumusha
Performers of Christian hip hop music
Year of birth missing (living people)